Welfesholz is a village and a former municipality in the Mansfeld-Südharz district, Saxony-Anhalt, Germany. Since 1 January 2010, it is part of the town Gerbstedt. The place became famous because of the Battle of Welfesholz in 1115.

External links
gemeinde-welfesholz Official Website

Gerbstedt
Former municipalities in Saxony-Anhalt